Vincent Radermecker (born 5 July 1967) is a Belgian auto racing driver.

Racing career

Early years
After starting in racing through karting in his home land of Belgium in 1986, he drove in the Benelux Formula Ford Championship. He was champion in his second year in the series in 1991. In 1992 he raced in Great Britain, with a drive in the British Formula Ford Championship, finishing fourth on points. He finished as runner-up in the 1993 Formula Opel Euroseries, before returning to Britain with Formula 3. He finished as runner-up again, moving to race a part season in the 1995 German Formula 3 Championship a year later.
In 1997 he switched to saloon cars, racing in the Belgian ProCar Championship. He finished third on points driving a Peugeot 406. In 1998 he changed his car to a Peugeot 306, ending the season in fifth place.

BTCC
In 1999 he got a drive in the British Touring Car Championship with the successful Volvo works team in a Volvo S40. He replaced Gianni Morbidelli in the team, who had a poor year in 1998, alongside defending champion Rickard Rydell. In a year of mixed fortunes including five podiums, he finished the championship in eighth place. With half the manufacturers leaving the BTCC in 2000, including Volvo, Radermecker found himself with a seat in the Vauxhall Team. It was not a good year for him, as the third driver in the team behind Yvan Muller and Jason Plato. He finished in tenth place, the lowest placed works driver.

Return to Belgium
With the end of the Super Touring era in the BTCC, he returned to the 2001 ProCar Championship in Belgium. He won the series driving an Opel Astra. He finished second in the French Super Touring Championship in 2002. On return to Belgium in 2005, he won the Belgian Touring Car Championship.

Recent years

Since 2004 he has driven in selected races in the FIA GT Championship, in various cars including a Nissan 350 Z, a Corvette C5R and a Mosler MT 900. In 2008 he drove a Ferrari 430 GT3 for Exagon Engineering, as well as a full season in the Belgian GT Championship. He has also done some Touring Car racing, winning the 2006 ADAC Procar Series in Germany, combined with selected rounds of the 2006 World Touring Car Championship with Maurer Motorsport. He returned to the WTCC at the Zolder round in 2010.

Racing record

Complete British Touring Car Championship results
(key) (Races in bold indicate pole position – 1 point awarded all races) (Races in italics indicate fastest lap) (* signifies that driver lead feature race for at least one lap – 1 point awarded)

‡ Retired before second start of race

Complete World Touring Car Championship results
(key) (Races in bold indicate pole position) (Races in italics indicate fastest lap)

Complete 24 Hours of Spa results

TCR Spa 500 results

External links
 BTCC Pages Profile.

1967 births
Living people
Belgian racing drivers
German Formula Three Championship drivers
British Formula Three Championship drivers
British Touring Car Championship drivers
FIA GT Championship drivers
World Touring Car Championship drivers
EFDA Nations Cup drivers
Porsche Supercup drivers
Blancpain Endurance Series drivers
24 Hours of Spa drivers
European Touring Car Cup drivers
24H Series drivers
Carlin racing drivers
W Racing Team drivers
Nürburgring 24 Hours drivers
21st-century Belgian people
TCR Europe Touring Car Series drivers
Hyundai Motorsport drivers